Rheinbahn is a public transport operator operating in Düsseldorf, Meerbusch and Kreis Mettmann. Its network consists of the Düsseldorf Stadtbahn, a network of 11 Stadtbahn (light rail) lines which are integrated in the Rhine-Ruhr Stadtbahn network, as well as Düsseldorf's tram system and 92 bus lines. In 2004, Rheinbahn transported 690,000 passengers per day.

Areas served
Two Stadtbahn lines are former light railway lines and connect to the cities of Duisburg (D-Bahn, U79) and Krefeld via Meerbusch (K-Bahn, U70/U76).

The neighbouring city of Neuss is connected to the Rheinbahn network by Stadtbahn line U75 and tram line 709. The neighbouring city of Ratingen is connected by Stadtbahn line U72.

Rheinbahn's bus lines cover Düsseldorf, Meerbusch and most parts of Kreis Mettmann.

Organisation
Rheinbahn is a member of the Verkehrsverbund Rhein-Ruhr (VRR), the public transport association covering the area of the Rhine-Ruhr megalopolis.

Lifetime contracts issue
Between 1980 and 2001, Rheinbahn issued employment contracts which failed to set an end for the salary payments, resulting in these employees receiving their salaries until their deaths. Although the company indicated that it was attempting to resolve this contractual oversight amicably, this strategy relied entirely on the agreement and goodwill of each employee, as the contracts were considered legally watertight. As of 2019, 37 of these contracts were still in active effect. Rheinbahn spokesman Georg Schumacher stated that over 100 such contracts had been issued in total. 
According to the Munich-based tabloid TZ, several of these contracts are for senior managers who earn in the region of €8,000 per month.

See also
List of rapid transit systems
Düsseldorf Stadtbahn
Trams in Düsseldorf

References

External links 
Home page, in German and English
Network map (PDF), from the Verkehrsverbund Rhein-Ruhr
 

Public transport operators of Germany
Tram transport in Germany
Companies based in Düsseldorf
Transport in Düsseldorf